National Highway 327B, commonly called NH 327B is a national highway in state of West Bengal in India. NH 327B is smallest national highway in India. It is a branch of National Highway 327. NH 327B is a very small stretch linking border town Panitanki in India to border town Kakarbhitta in Nepal.

Route 
Panitanki to Mechi Bridge across Mechi River.

Junctions  

Terminal with NH327 near Panitanki.

Terminal with Mahendra Highway.

See also 
 List of National Highways in India by highway number

References 

National highways in India
National Highways in West Bengal